John Denver's Greatest Hits Volume 2 is a compilation album by American singer-songwriter John Denver, released in 1977. The single released from this album is "My Sweet Lady." It peaked at No. 13 on the adult contemporary chart, No. 32 on the pop chart, and No. 62 on the country chart in the United States.

As with his previous Greatest Hits album, Denver re-recorded many of his hits instead of using the original recordings.

In 1982 the album was re-released with a different cover in many countries. On this release "Welcome to My Morning" was replaced with the duet version of "Perhaps Love".

Track listing
All tracks written by John Denver except where noted.

Charts

Certifications

References

John Denver compilation albums
1977 greatest hits albums
Albums produced by Milt Okun
RCA Records compilation albums